Vermeiren is a Dutch toponymic surname mostly found in Belgium. It is a dialectical and contracted version of the surname Van der Meer ("from the lake"). Vermeiren is most common in the province of Antwerp, while the variant Vermeire is most abundant in East Flanders. Notable people with the surname include:

Annie Vermeiren (born 1930s), Belgian racing cyclist
 (born 1936), Belgian PVV politician
Goedele Vermeiren (born 1962), Belgian N-VA politician
Jan Vermeiren (born 1949), Belgian-born South-African painter
Didier Vermeiren (born 1951), Belgian sculptor
Katleen Vermeiren (born 1978), Belgian racing cyclist
 (1914–2005), Belgian children's book author
Paul Vermeiren (born 1963), Belgian archer
Remi Vermeiren (born 1940), Belgian banker and businessman
Vermeir / Vermeire
Bert Vermeir (born 1977), Belgium Paralympic equestrian
Katrien Vermeire (born 1979), Belgian artist
Manuel Vermeire (born 1987), Belgian printmaker
Robert Vermeire (born 1944), Belgian cyclo-cross rider

See also
Vermeer (disambiguation)

References

Dutch-language surnames
Surnames of Belgian origin
Toponymic surnames